is a former Japanese football player.

Playing career
Sakamoto was born in Hyogo Prefecture on May 30, 1972. After graduating from Shizuoka Gakuen High School, he joined All Nippon Airways (later Yokohama Flügels) in 1991. He debuted in September 1993 and played several matches in 1993 season. However he could not play at all in the match from 1994 and retired end of 1996 season.

Club statistics

References

External links

1972 births
Living people
Association football people from Hyōgo Prefecture
Japanese footballers
Japan Soccer League players
J1 League players
Yokohama Flügels players
Association football forwards